Gaebong Station belongs to Seoul Subway Line 1.

References

Seoul Metropolitan Subway stations
Railway stations opened in 1974
Metro stations in Guro District, Seoul